In Greek mythology, Myles (Ancient Greek: Μύλης means 'mill-man') was an ancient king of Laconia. He was the son of the King Lelex and possibly the naiad Queen Cleocharia, and brother of Polycaon. Myles was the father of Eurotas who begotten Sparta after whom the city of Sparta was named.

Mythology 
After Lelex's death, Myles ruled over Laconia, and later on, following his own death, his son Eurotas succeeded him. Myles was said to be the first mortal to invent a mill and ground corn in Alesiae.

References 

Princes in Greek mythology
Mythological kings of Laconia
Kings in Greek mythology
Laconian characters in Greek mythology
Laconian mythology